Colin Coen is an Irish hurler who played as a left corner-back for the Galway senior team.

Coen joined the team during the 2005 National League and was a regular member of the team for two seasons. An All-Ireland medalist win the minor grade, he enjoyed little success at senior level. He ended up as an All-Ireland Senior championship runner-up on one occasion.

At club level Coen plays with the Ballinderreen club, where he won a Galway Intermediate county final in 2000.

References

1978 births
Living people
Ballinderreen hurlers
Galway inter-county hurlers